was a Japanese jazz / free improvisation / noise musician. He was active in the Japanese jazz scene from the late 1950s. In the 1960s he formed New Directions (later New Direction Unit), which recorded several albums throughout the 1970s. He also recorded several albums with saxophonist Kaoru Abe, including Kaitai Teki Kohkan, Gradually Projection and Mass Projection.

Discography 
As leader/co-leader
  (TBM, 1972) - live recorded 1963
 Flower Girl (Jinya Disc, 1968)
 Independence: Tread On Sure Ground (Tiliqua, 1970)
 Call In Question (PSF, 1994) - recorded 1970
 Live Independence (PSF, 1970)
 A Jazzy Profile of Jojo (Victor,I1970)
 Kaitai Teki Kohkan with Kaoru Abe (Sound Creators, 1970)
 Mass Projection with Kaoru Abe (DIW, 1970)
 Gradually Projection with Kaoru Abe (DIW, 1970)
 Complete "La Grima" (1971) – live 
 Free Form Suite (TBM, 1972)
 Eclipse (Iskra, 1975)
 Mass Hysterism: In Another Situation (Jinya Disc, 1983)
 Dislocation  (Jinya Disc, 1983)
 Action Direct: Live At Zojoji Hall (ALM, 1985)
 El Pulso (Jinya Disc, 1990)
 Reason For Being (Jinya Disc, 1990) with Nobuyoshi Ino 
 Inanimate Nature: Action Direct/Live At Jean Jean (Jinya Disc, 1990)
 Three Improvised Variations On A Theme Of Qadhafi (Jinya Disc, 1990)
 April Is The Cruellest Month (Jinya Disc, 1991) - recorded 1975
 Axis: Another Revolvable Thing Part 1 (Offbeat, 2006) - recorded in 1975
 Axis: Another Revolvable Thing Part 2 (Offbeat, 2006) - recorded in 1975
 Live at Jazz inn Lovely 1990 (NoBusiness,	2020) with Masabumi Kikuchi, Nobuyoshi Ino - live recorded in 1990

External links
 Complete discography
 https://neuguitars.com/2017/10/12/masayuki-takayanagis-playlist-on-neuguitars-blog/

Japanese jazz guitarists
Free improvising musicians
1932 births
1991 deaths
Musicians from Tokyo
20th-century Japanese musicians
P.S.F. Records artists
20th-century guitarists